Michael Kasha (December 6, 1920 – June 12, 2013) was an American physical chemist and molecular spectroscopist who was one of the original founders of the Institute of Molecular Biophysics at Florida State University .

Education and early work

Born in Elizabeth, NJ to a family of Ukrainian immigrants, Kasha studied chemical engineering at night at the Cooper Union in New York City for two years while working full-time during the days at the Merck & Co. research facility in New Jersey. He then received a full scholarship to the University of Michigan, where he completed a bachelor's degree in chemistry. He earned his Ph.D. in chemistry from University of California at Berkeley in 1945, working with renowned physical chemist G.N. Lewis. Following postdoctoral work with Robert Mulliken, he joined the Chemistry department at Florida State University as a faculty member in 1951.

Awards and honors

Kasha was a Distinguished University Research Professor at Florida State University. He was elected member to the National Academy of Sciences in 1971, the first Floridian to be so honored. He was inducted into the American Academy of Arts & Sciences (in 1963), as well as the International Academy of Quantum Molecular Science.

Important contributions

The research in his molecular spectroscopy laboratory focused on the discovery and elucidation of excitation mechanisms, with particular application to photochemical and biophysical problems. His most important achievements include identifying triplet states as source of phosphorescence emission, formulating the Kasha rule on fluorescence, and his work on singlet molecular oxygen.

Kasha is also known for his interest in improving the sound quality and durability of the acoustic guitar and the classic string instruments.  A 30-year collaboration with luthier Richard Schneider led to a series of innovative changes to the traditional classical guitar. His guitar design was patented  and is known as the "Kasha guitar".

Literature
 R. Hochstrasser, J. Saltiel. Research Career of Michael Kasha. J. Phys. Chem. A, 2003, 107 (18), pp 3161–3162
 Michael Kasha - Editorial, Biographical Sketch, Summary of Research Contributions, Research Associates, and Publications list J . Phys. Chem., 1991, 95 (25), pp 10215–10220

References

External links
 Florida State University faculty profile
 Michael Kasha Lecture Video Lecture provided by the Vega Science Trust.
 Memorial website to Michael Kasha  from the Institute of Molecular Biophysics at Florida State University
 The Kasha Guitar
 2004 Video Interview “In Conversation with Michael Kasha” : Nobel Laureate Sir Harry Kroto interviews Dr. Michael Kasha about his life and career

1920 births
2013 deaths
Florida State University faculty
Fellows of the American Academy of Arts and Sciences
American biochemists
Members of the International Academy of Quantum Molecular Science
American physical chemists
Spectroscopists
American people of Ukrainian descent
People from Elizabeth, New Jersey
Members of the United States National Academy of Sciences
University of Michigan alumni